Francis Marlow (8 October 1867 Tamworth, Staffordshire - 7 August 1952 Hove, Sussex) was an English cricketer who played first-class cricket principally for Sussex

Career
Marlow played 219 first-class matches between 1891-1904. The right-handed batsman made 7890 runs at an average of 22.16. His right-arm medium pace bowling took four wickets averaging at 49.00.

References

1867 births
1952 deaths
English cricketers
Sportspeople from Tamworth, Staffordshire
Sussex cricketers
North v South cricketers
Players cricketers